PinkNews is a UK-based online newspaper marketed to the lesbian, gay, bisexual and transgender community (LGBT) in the UK and worldwide. It was founded by Benjamin Cohen in July 2005.

It closely follows political progress on LGBT rights around the world, and carries interviews with cultural figures and politicians. The news is split into different sections, with most recent, prominent and trending stories showing on the home page by default. People can filter news by the sections they have most interest in, including: transgender, entertainment, world, politics, arts, and opinion.

PinkNews pays special attention to the topic of religion and homosexuality. It became one of the few LGBT publications to have interviewed an incumbent Archbishop of Canterbury in 2014, when Justin Welby discussed the Church of England's approach to homosexuality.

PinkNews runs the PinkNews Awards, which launched in 2013 and take place annually in Westminster. The awards, which are voted on by the public alongside a panel of judges, honour the work of LGBT activists in the field as well as political speakers and businesses. Previous high-profile PinkNews Awards winners include John Bercow, Nick Clegg, Richard Branson, Ed Miliband, Alex Salmond and David Cameron.

History 
PinkNews was founded by Benjamin Cohen in July 2005. A paper version, The PinkNews was officially launched in 2006. However, PinkNews became an online-only publication when the print edition was dropped in 2007. The website is updated daily with news.

In 2018, PinkNews became the first LGBTQ+ publisher on Snapchat. It had an operating profit of £2million in 2021. The website was redesigned in 2022. New filtering features were also added to its app in an attempt to counter news avoidance due to negative reporting.

Editorial policy and interviews with politicians
The editorial stance of PinkNews is not to campaign in a partisan manner, although it does interview politicians and has a pro-LGBT stance. PinkNews does not endorse political parties in elections, but in previous elections has endorsed individual politicians regardless of party "based on their stance on gay rights issues."

To date PinkNews has published articles by six British Prime Ministers: John Major, Tony Blair, Gordon Brown, David Cameron, Theresa May, and Boris Johnson. PinkNews has also interviewed other political figures in the United Kingdom, including Nick Clegg and Jeremy Corbyn, who has also written for the paper. On 2 January 2020, UK MP Layla Moran revealed in an interview with PinkNews that she is pansexual; she is believed to be the first UK parliamentarian to come out as pansexual.

News International legal threat
In 2006, two tabloid newspapers, the News of the World and The Sun, published a false story about two Premiership footballers having a gay orgy with a DJ. Although the News of the World did not name any of them, it used a pixelated photograph of footballer Ashley Cole to illustrate the story. PinkNews published what it claimed to be the unpixelated original photograph. Cole, along with the DJ, Masterstepz, sued these tabloids' parent company News International and won at least £100,000 plus legal costs. News International threatened to pursue PinkNews, under the Civil Liability (Contribution) Act 1978, for a share in these costs, but did not in the end follow through. If they had, PinkNews would have been closed down, as it was just a startup at the time.

Relationship with Stonewall
PinkNews reported heavily on the refusal of Stonewall, an LGBT rights group, to actively campaign for gay marriage. Stonewall's then Chief Executive Ben Summerskill suggested "it would cost a staggering £5 billion to implement", a figure later seized upon by opponents of same-sex marriage despite its lack of factual basis. The rift came to a head at Liberal Democrats conference in 2010, where Summerskill argued that "there are lots of lesbians who actually don't want marriage". The event was attended by Lynne Featherstone, the minister for equality; Evan Harris, president of Liberal Democrat LGBT group DELGA; and Steve Gilbert, the Lib Dem MP, all of whom said they supported same-sex marriage. A poll commissioned by PinkNews and answered by more than 800 of their readership found 98% in support of marriage equality, with many comments calling for Summerskill's resignation. Stonewall was also criticised by a former founder, Michael Cashman, MEP, over its policy.

Summerskill later accused PinkNews of running an "unethical campaign" against Stonewall after asking every LGBT organisation and political group to outline their stance on the issue, with only Stonewall refusing to comment. In October 2010, Stonewall revised its policy and agreed to support same-sex marriage, stating "Stonewall is pleased to be widening its campaigning objectives to include extending the legal form of marriage to gay people".

PinkNews also regularly reported on criticism of Stonewall for its refusal to campaign on transgender issues. PinkNews has collaborated closely with Stonewall following the departure of Summerskill in 2014. A year later, under Chief Executive Ruth Hunt, Stonewall decided to begin campaigning on transgender issues.

In 2017, Stonewall and PinkNews co-hosted an election hustings, and Ruth Hunt has written for PinkNews on a number of occasions.

Advertising and support
PinkNews was an official supporter of the Coalition for Equal Marriage (C4EM), a counter-organisation to the Coalition for Marriage, and successfully petitioned for the introduction of same-sex marriage rights in England and Wales, while the Coalition for Marriage campaigned against it.
PinkNews named 25 January as Peter Tatchell Day to celebrate the British political campaigner's 60th birthday, 45 years of human rights campaigning and 10 years since the launch of the Peter Tatchell Foundation. PinkNews also published a prose poem written by Stephen Fry in honour of Tatchell's birthday on 24 January and frequently carries advertisements for the Peter Tatchell Foundation.
On 25 April 2012 PinkNews began using a video for the Coalition for Equal Marriage in their advertising space, wrote articles in support of it and gave it their official backing, encouraging readers to respond to the government consultation to show their opinions.
PinkNews regularly reported on the progress of the Out4Marriage campaign, which was started in May 2012 and launched by Mike Buonaiuto and PinkNews founder, Benjamin Cohen. The campaign used YouTube videos of people supporting equal marriage, including celebrities and Members of Parliament, finishing with the line "And that’s why I’m out for marriage. Are you?". The Out4Marriage YouTube campaign reached 14 million views in just three weeks from launch.

See also 

 LGBT culture
 LGBT rights in the United Kingdom
 List of LGBT periodicals
 The Pink Paper

References

External links
 Official website
  PinkNews at SimilarWeb

Internet properties established in 2005
British news websites
LGBT-related mass media in the United Kingdom
LGBT-related newspapers published in the United Kingdom
LGBT-related websites
Newspapers established in 2005
2005 establishments in the United Kingdom